Let Me Rock You is the third solo studio album released by American musician and former Kiss drummer Peter Criss. Due to poor sales for his previous album, Out of Control, Let Me Rock You was not released in the United States until 1998, when it was reissued on CD. The album was produced by Vini Poncia, who previously produced Criss's 1978 solo album (officially released as a Kiss album). Let Me Rock You features the song "Feels Like Heaven", written by Criss's former bandmate, Gene Simmons. Vinnie Cusano also co-wrote a song for the album; at the same year the album was released, Cusano became known as Vinnie Vincent when he replaced Kiss guitarist Ace Frehley. The album cover features Peter Criss for the first time without his Kiss makeup, as he did not appear on the cover of his solo album Out of Control. One year later, Kiss also decided to take off their makeup for their Lick It Up album.

Only one single from the album was released—"Tears", with a cover of John Lennon's "Jealous Guy" as the B-side.  The album charted for two weeks in Norway, peaking at #29.

Track listing
"Let It Go" (Tommy Faragher, Davey Faragher, Brie Howard) – 4:05
"Tears" (Vinnie Cusano, Adam Mitchell) – 3:36
"Move on Over" (Peter Criss, Vini Poncia) – 3:48
"Jealous Guy" (John Lennon) – 3:58
"Destiny" (Charlie Midnight, Cash Monet, Jeff Schoen) – 4:11
"Some Kinda' Hurricane" (Russ Ballard) – 4:04
"Let Me Rock You" (Ballard) – 3:37
"First Day in the Rain" (Steve Stevens) – 3:32
"Feel Like Heaven" (Gene Simmons) – 3:43
"Bad Boys" (Criss, Jim Roberge) – 3:28

Personnel
Peter Criss – vocals, drums
Michael Landau – guitars
Steve Stevens – guitars
Steve Lukather – guitars
Caleb Quaye – guitars
Bobby Messano – guitars, backing vocals
Phil Grande – guitars
John "Cooker" Lo Presti – bass
Davey Faragher – bass
Michael Braun – guest drums
Dennis Conway – guest drums
James Newton Howard – keyboards, synthesizer
Jai Winding – keyboards
Jim Roberge – keyboards
Ed Walsh – synthesizer
Vini Poncia – backing vocals
Gene Simmons – backing vocals
Rory Dodd – backing vocals
Eric Troyer – backing vocals
Mark Kreider – backing vocals
Suzanne Fellini – backing vocals

References 

1982 albums
Peter Criss albums
Albums produced by Vini Poncia
Casablanca Records albums